Hales and Shadwell Woods is a  biological Site of Special Scientific Interest north-east of Saffron Walden in Essex. Shadwell Wood has an area of 7.1 hectares and it is managed by the Essex Wildlife Trust. Hales Wood is a National Nature Reserve, and it is listed in the Nature Conservation Review.

The woods, which are under half a mile apart, are both ancient coppice wet ash and maple on chalky boulder clay. The shrub layer is diverse, with plants including wayfaring-trees, guelder roses, spurge-laurel and the nationally uncommon oxlip. Seven species of orchid have been recorded in Shadwell Wood, which also has herb-rich grassy rides.

There is access to Shadwell Wood by a footpath from Walden Road, but no access to Hales Wood.

References 

Sites of Special Scientific Interest in Essex
Essex Wildlife Trust
Nature Conservation Review sites